Ochyraea tatrensis is a species of moss in the family Amblystegiaceae endemic to Slovakia.  Its natural habitat is rivers. It is threatened by habitat loss.

References

Hypnales
Critically endangered plants
Endemic flora of Slovakia
Taxonomy articles created by Polbot